Ceratitis andranotobaka is a species of tephritid fruit fly.

References 

Dacinae
Agricultural pest insects